Megacraspedus coniodes is a moth of the family Gelechiidae. It was described by Edward Meyrick in 1904. It is found in Australia, where it has been recorded from South Australia.

The forewings are light greyish ochreous, sprinkled with dark fuscous. The stigmata are blackish, with the plical obliquely beyond the first discal. The hindwings are light grey.

References

Moths described in 1904
Megacraspedus